Ritz Theatre or Ritz Theater is the name of several facilities:

In England
 Ritz Theatre (Lincoln, England)

In Australia
 Ritz Cinema, Sydney, a heritage-listed theatre in Sydney, New South Wales

In the United States
Ritz Theatre (Brunswick, Georgia), contributing property of the Brunswick Old Town Historic District
Ritz Theatre (Jacksonville), Duval County, Florida
Wayne Densch Performing Arts Center, Sanford, Seminole County, Florida, formerly the Ritz Theater, the Milane Theatre, and the Helen Stairs Theatre
Ritz Theatre (Haddon Township, New Jersey)
Ritz Theater (Newburgh, New York), Orange County
Walter Kerr Theatre, New York City, originally the Ritz Theatre
Ritz Theatre and Hoskins Rexall Drug Store No. 2, on the National Register of Historic Places listings in Anderson County, Tennessee
Ritz (Austin, Texas)
Ritz Theatre (Elizabeth, New Jersey)

See also
 Ritz (disambiguation), other cinemas and facilities named "Ritz"
 Ritz Cinema (disambiguation)

Lists of theatres